Šariš Castle (Slovak: Šarišský hrad, Hungarian: Sáros vára) is a ruined Gothic and Renaissance era stone castle above the town of Veľký Šariš in Prešov District, Prešov Region, Slovakia. It is a hilltop castle located on a cone-shaped hill with a wide plateau at its top, in an altitude of approximately 570 m (1870.07 ft) above sea level. The ruins lie 6-7 km northwest of Prešov, Slovakia, in the traditional region Šariš. The castle is listed in the National Cultural Heritage list of the Monuments Board of the Slovak Republic.

History

The castle is one of the oldest and biggest castles in Slovakia. It was permanently settled from the Neolithic to the 4th century AD, then from the 10th to the 12th century, and finally a new castle was built in the 13th century. The castle was destroyed by fire in 1678.

The former county and traditional region of Šariš both draw their name from the name of the castle, due to it having served as the original county seat for several centuries (as was common with many Hungarian castles serving this political function).

Gallery

See also
List of castles in Slovakia

References

External links

 Official website of the civic association Rákociho cesta (in Slovak) - Civic historical association currently in charge of restoration works on the castle. 

Castles in Slovakia
Ruined castles in Slovakia
Buildings and structures in Prešov Region
Tourist attractions in Prešov Region
13th-century architecture in Slovakia
Gothic architecture in Slovakia
Renaissance architecture in Slovakia